Salman Kandi may refer to:
 Salman Kandi, Meshgin Shahr
 Salman Kandi, Parsabad, Ardabil Province
 Salman Kandi, East Azerbaijan
 Salman Kandi, Zanjan